Dame Muriel Joan Marsham (née Warry; 4 January 1888 – 13 March 1972), DBE, was a British philanthropist and chairman of the executive committee of the Girl Guides Association from 1938 to 1948. She was Chair of the National Women's Auxiliary of the Young Men's Christian Association (founded in Britain in 1918) from 1931 until her death in 1972.

Background
Born as Muriel Joan Warry, the daughter of William Warry of Shapwick, Somerset, England, she married the Hon. Sydney Edward Marsham (son of Charles Marsham, 4th Earl of Romney and Lady Frances Augusta Constance Muir Rawdon-Hastings) on 2 February 1911. The couple had one child.

Honours
She was awarded the OBE and later was elevated to DBE in 1945 "for public services".

She was awarded the Silver Fish Award, Girl Guiding's highest adult honour, in the 1940s.

Family
Husband: Hon. Sydney Edward Marsham (b. 29 December 1879 — d. 6 January 1952)
Child: Lt.-Col. Peter William Marsham (b. 8 June 1913 — d. 3 November 1970)
married, in 1946, to Hersey ( Coke; 1915 — 2012) and had the following children:
 Julian Charles Marsham, 8th Earl of Romney (b. 28 March 1948)
 Lady Lavinia Marsham (b. 6 February 1950)
 Lady Sarah Marsham (b. 3 October 1954)
 Davinia Marsham (b. 13 February 1956 - d. 22 May 1956)

References

External links
Oxford Index #101052041
Peerage.org

1888 births
1972 deaths
Dames Commander of the Order of the British Empire
Girlguiding officials
People from Sedgemoor (district)
Recipients of the Silver Fish Award
20th-century British philanthropists
YMCA leaders